The 1900 Columbia Blue and White football team was an American football team that represented Columbia University as an independent during the 1900 college football season.  In its second season under head coach George Sanford, the team compiled a 7–3–1 record and outscored opponents by a total of  including six shutouts. Bill Morley was the team captain.

Columbia's sports teams were commonly called the "Blue and White" in this era, but had no official nickname. The name "Lions" would not be adopted until 1910.

The team played its home games at Columbia Field in New York City.

Schedule

References

Columbia
Columbia Lions football seasons
Columbia Blue and White football